Ranjit Sondhi CBE was a BBC Governor with responsibility for the English regions. First appointed in August 1998, his term of office was renewed for another four years in 2002 and finished in October 2006.

He is a senior lecturer at the University of Birmingham, Westhill.

He was appointed CBE in the 1999 New Year Honours.

References

External links

BBC Governors
People educated at Bedford School
Academics of the University of Birmingham
British people of South Asian descent
Commanders of the Order of the British Empire
Year of birth missing (living people)
Living people
British people of Indian descent
British people of Punjabi descent